The 1964 South Australian National Football League season was the 85th season of the top-level Australian rules football competition in South Australia.

The competition expanded from eight to ten teams, with the addition of Central District and Woodville.

Ladder

Finals Series

Grand Final

References 

SANFL

South Australian National Football League seasons